Samalapuram is a suburb of Tirupur in the Indian state of Tamil Nadu. Samalapuram is located near the twin townships of  Somanur, Karumathampatti between Avinashi road and Trichy Road. It comes under the Palladam Taluk and Tiruppur district. The place is very famous for Vaazhaithottathu Ayyan Kovil.

Demographics
 India census, Samalapuram had a population of 14,816. Males constitute 51% of the population and females 49%. Samalapuram has an average literacy rate of 65%, higher than the national average of 59.5%: male literacy is 67%, and female literacy is 62%. In Samalapuram, 10% of the population is under 6 years of age.

References

Cities and towns in Tiruppur district